Ritesh may refer to: 
Ritesh Deshmukh, Indian actor
J. K. Rithesh (born 1973), Indian actor and MP
Ritesh Sidhwani (born 1971), Indian film producer
Ritesh Seth, Indian billionaire and founder of Oyo Rooms